= Jiancheng Shi =

Jiancheng Shi from the Institute for Remote Sensing Applications Chinese Academy of Sciences, Beijing, China was named Fellow of the Institute of Electrical and Electronics Engineers (IEEE) in 2014 for contributions to active and passive microwave remote sensing.
